State Route 107 (SR 107) is a  state highway in the western part of the U.S. state of Alabama.

Route description

SR 107 is aligned on a two-lane road as it travels through Fayette and Marion counties. It is a parallel route to U.S. Route 43 (US 43), aligned west of the U.S. Highway. The route serves to connect the towns at its southern and northern termini and does not pass through any incorporated cities or towns.

Major intersections

See also

References

107
Transportation in Fayette County, Alabama
Transportation in Marion County, Alabama